The Sétif Tramway (in ) is a system of public transport in Sétif, Algeria. The first section includes  of route and 26 stops.

The Sétif Tramway was built and equipped by a joint venture of Alstom and Turkey-based construction company Yapı Merkezi.

The Sétif Tramway commenced public services on 8 May 2018.

References

Light rail in Algeria
Tram transport in Algeria
2018 establishments in Algeria